Günther Paulitsch (born 14 November 1939) is an Austrian footballer. He played in one match for the Austria national football team in 1964.

References

External links
 

1939 births
Living people
Austrian footballers
Austria international footballers
Place of birth missing (living people)
Association footballers not categorized by position